Milton Park is a  mixed use business and technology park in Oxfordshire, England, operated by MEPC plc. 

It is on the site of a former Ministry of Defence depot between the A34 and Didcot power station. Although closer to Didcot, it lies within the Abingdon postcode area.

Occupiers
Milton Park is home to 7,500 people and 250 organisations. It includes the offices of Alamy, RM Education,  Halliburton and Taylor & Francis, offices of eBay Classifieds Group, ITV, Planet IT, and distribution depots for DHL and UPS. Manufacturing includes a battery manufacturing centre for Johnson Matthey. The Vale of White Horse District Council offices are also in Milton Park.

Pharmaceutical companies are represented by Evotec, Vertex Pharmaceuticals, Hypha Discovery, Immunocore among others.

Milton Park has  of business accommodation, and houses the Milton Park Innovation Centre, a flagship innovation centre for fast-growing science and technology businesses. The centre plans to expand to a working population of 20,000 people by 2040.

Transport
Milton Park is served by Thames Travel bus services X2 (Oxford-Abingdon-Milton Park-Didcot), X32 (JR Hospital-Oxford-Milton Park-Didcot-Harwell-Wantage), X36 (Didcot-Milton Park-Grove-Wantage), 33 (Abingdon-Milton Park-Didcot-Wallingford) and 99A/99C (Great Western Park-Milton Park). There is a disused siding for rail freight, connected to the Great Western Main Line. The nearest train service is to Didcot Parkway station and Thames Travel runs regular bus services from the station to the business park.

References

External links

Business parks of England
Economy of Oxfordshire
High-technology business districts in the United Kingdom
Vale of White Horse
2000 establishments in England